Redundancy or redundant may refer to:

Language
 Redundancy (linguistics), information that is expressed more than once

Engineering and computer science
 Data redundancy, database systems which have a field that is repeated in two or more tables
 Logic redundancy, a digital gate network containing circuitry that does not affect the static logic function
 Redundancy (engineering), the duplication of critical components or functions of a system with the intention of increasing reliability
 Redundancy (information theory), the number of bits used to transmit a message minus the number of bits of actual information in the message
 Redundancy in total quality management, quality which exceeds the required quality level, creating unnecessarily high costs
 The same task executed by several different methods in a user interface

Biology
 Codon redundancy, the redundancy of the genetic code exhibited as the multiplicity of three-codon combinations
 Cytokine redundancy, a term in immunology referring to the phenomenon in which, and the ability of, multiple cytokines to exert similar actions
 Gene redundancy, the existence of several genes in the genome of an organism that perform the same role to some extent

As a proper name
 "Redundant" (song), 1997 song by American rock band Green Day
 Redundant (play), 2001 drama by Leo Butler

Other uses
 Redundant church, no longer used for worship
 Redundancy in United Kingdom law, dismissal for economic reasons

See also
 
 
 Voluntary redundancy, termination of employment by agreement between employee and employer